Efraim Sicher is an Israeli literary scholar. He obtained his PhD at Oxford University and taught at Ben-Gurion University of the Negev until his retirement in 2022. Among his investigations of narrative and memory, he has written on modern Jewish culture and Holocaust literature. He is the author of numerous books and article on the Russian Jewish writer Isaac Babel. He edited the Penguin Classics edition of Babel's short story collection Red Cavalry. His work on postmodern Jewish writers includes the controversial Reenvisoning Jewish Identities: Reflections on Contemporary Culture in Israel and the Diaspora (2021) and Postmodern Love: Negotiating Jewish Identites and Spaces (2022), which challenged the consensus of separate cultures in Israel and America and pointed to the blurring of boundaries of gender, sexual, and ethnic identies in a breakdown of "Jewishness" and an erosion of history. Lederhendler, Eli. “Re-Envisioning Jewish Identities: Reflections on Contemporary Culture in Israel and the Diaspora by Efraim Sicher.” Partial Answers, vol. 21, no. 1, 2023, pp. 176–78, https://doi.org/10.1353/pan.2023.0011.

Selected works
 The Holocaust Novel 
 Race, Color, Identity: Rethinking Discourses about 'Jews' in the Twenty-First Century (editor) 
 Breaking Crystal: Writing and Memory after Auschwitz (editor)
 Rereading the City/Rereading Dickens: Representation, the Novel, and Urban Realism
 Style And Structure In The Prose Of Isaak Babel 
 Jews in Russian Literature After the October Revolution
 Under Postcolonial Eyes: Figuring the "Jew" in Contemporary British Writing (with Linda Weinhouse) 
 Holocaust Novelists (Dictionary of Literary Biography vol. 299) 
 Beyond Marginality: Anglo-Jewish Literature After the Holocaust 
 The Jew's Daughter: A Cultural History of a Conversion Narrative 
 Babel' in Context: A Study in Cultural Identity

References

Israeli scholars
Year of birth missing (living people)
Living people